The Baghdad Cup was a friendly football match played between Al-Shorta and Al-Zawraa on 16 June 2013 at Al-Shaab Stadium to conclude the Festival of Brotherhood, Love and Peace.

Baghdad Cup may also refer to:

 Iraq FA Baghdad Cup, a tournament organised by the Iraq Football Association in 1974
 Iraqi Elite Cup, a tournament that was renamed "Baghdad Championship" for its final edition in 2003